Desportivo da Eka is an Angolan football club based in the town of Dondo, Kwanza Norte in north Angola.

The club is attached and named after Angola's brewery EKA (Empresa Angolana de Cervejas, SARL).

League & Cup Positions

Stadium
Desportivo da Eka's home stadium is nicknamed Inferno do Dondo (Dondo's Hell).

Manager history and performance

References

External links

Football clubs in Angola